Foucault is a surname. Notable people with the surname include:

Jean-Pierre Foucault (born 1947), French television host
Jeffrey Foucault (born 1976), American songwriter
Léon Foucault (1819–1868), French physicist
Michel Foucault (1926–1984), French philosopher
Steve Foucault (born 1949), former Major League Baseball pitcher
David Foucault (born 1989), Canadian gridiron football player
Marcel Foucault (born 1865), French philosopher and psychologist

See also 
 Charles de Foucauld
 La Rochefoucauld (disambiguation)